Levi "Doctor Octoroc" Buffum is an American chiptune musician and pixel artist based in Philadelphia. 

It draws influence from 1980s pop culture and beyond, primarily video games from console systems made by Nintendo, the artist initially gained notable Internet recognition in December 2008 with his chiptunes album of Christmas songs arranged in the style of different Nintendo Entertainment System (NES) games, entitled 8-Bit Jesus.

The album was originally made available on December 8, 2008, as a free nine-track download from DoctorOctoroc.com, as an extension of the track that Doctor Octoroc contributed to the Foundation 9 Holiday Card, featuring ten other chiptunes artists, including 8-Bit Weapon and ComputeHer. 

After the small collection of tracks appeared on sites like Kotaku, Joystiq, Boing Boing, and Destructoid, Doctor Octoroc created nine more tracks for an even eighteen tracks total, which he posted to his blog on December 22. The complete physical album became available in a 6-panel digipak, designed by Jude Buffum, and includes an additional bonus track titled "Let It Snoki Doki Panic".

He later made a name for himself as a freelance artist, creating 8-bit and 16-bit parody animations, most notably his re-imagining of the Internet sensation Dr. Horrible's Sing-Along Blog (original film by Joss Whedon) as a theoretical NES game. Dr. Horrible's Sing-Along Game was released in April 2010 and since then, Buffum has created similar works of animation based on Twilight, Jersey Shore, Glee, Harry Potter, Doctor Who, and Man Vs. Wild.

Music
As a chiptunes artist, Octoroc uses a modded NES control deck as an instrument via MIDI CC signals that manipulate the console's hardware. He also composes tracks using soundfonts ripped from Super NES and Genesis games.

Albums
8-Bit Jesus (2008)

After These Messages (December 2010)

Shamroctoroc (March 2011)

In The RP2A Over The Sea (April 2019)

Doctor Octoroc has arranged and composed tracks contributed to Here Comes A New Challenger, Loser: A Sega Genesis Tribute, Iwadon: Hiroyuki Iwatsuki Tribute Album, and a 16-Bit arrangement of the Doctor Who (series 5) theme, as well as a similar arrangement of the opening song for the short-lived FOX TV show, Firefly.

Animation
As a result of the popularity that ensued after he released Dr. Horrible's Sing-Along Game, Octoroc began creating similar animations.

Full length animations

Dr. Horrible's Sing-Along Game (April 2010)
Initially created to visually accompany Doctor Octoroc's 8-bit arrangement of the Dr. Horrible soundtrack, the 8-Bit Dr. Horrible animation became the focus of the project, gaining attention from many of the cast and crew members of the original film. Among them, Felicia Day, Neil Patrick Harris, and Maurissa Tancharoen made positive mention of the animation on Twitter. 

The animation was also mentioned by celebrity gossip extraordinaire Perez Hilton, incorporating the moniker "Internet genius" into his description of the creator. In addition, a screenshot from the animation showed up during the 2010 Google I/0 day 2 keynote during a presentation about the beta of YouTube Lean Back.

Animated shorts
Below is a list of animated shorts created for various websites.

8-Bit Twilight (June 2010)
8-Bit Glee (September 2010)
8-Bit Harry Potter (November 2010)
Jersey Shore: The RPG (December 2010)
Mario's Night Before Christmas (December 2010)
Mario Paint Torture (January 2010)
Man Vs. Wild IV: Infinity Bear Saga (June 2011)
Saved By The Bell Interactive Game (August 2011)
Game of Thrones RPG (August 2011)

Other animations
YTCracker: The Link Music Video (July 2010)
Firewall (November 2010)
16-Bit Doctor Who Series 5 Intro (June 2011)
EneMemes (September 2012)

Notes

External links
 

Year of birth missing (living people)
Living people
Musicians from Philadelphia
American graphic designers
Chiptune musicians